David Dekker (born 2 February 1998) is a Dutch cyclist, who currently rides for UCI WorldTeam . He is the son of former professional cyclist Erik Dekker. In May 2021, Dekker was named in the startlist for the 2021 Giro d'Italia.

Major results

2016
 1st  Overall Tour des Portes du Pays d'Othe
 3rd Road race, National Junior Road Championships
 6th Menen-Kemmel-Menen
2018
 1st  Mountains classification Olympia's Tour
2019
 1st  Road race, National Under-23 Road Championships
 1st Stage 1 Carpathian Couriers Race
 10th Arno Wallaard Memorial
2020
 1st Ster van Zwolle
 1st Dorpenomloop Rucphen
 3rd Le Samyn
2021
 1st  Points classification, UAE Tour

Grand Tour general classification results timeline

References

External links

1998 births
Living people
Dutch male cyclists
Sportspeople from Amersfoort
Cyclists from Utrecht (province)
21st-century Dutch people